The genus Helopeltis, also known as mosquito bugs, is a group of Heteropterans in the family Miridae (capsid bugs) and tribe Dicyphini. They include important pests of various crops, including cacao, cashew, cotton and tea. Now in a different subgenus, a number of similar Afropeltis species are pests in Africa.

Mosquito bugs have a characteristic spine on the scutellum, which is a diagnostic feature. Classification in the field is based on morphological characteristics, with considerable variations in colouration between insects of the same species (although for example, H. theivora is characteristically green and H. antonii red-brown).

Damage and distribution
With typical Hemipteran sucking mouthparts, they pierce plant tissues and cause damage ranging from leaf tattering and fruit blemishes, to complete death of shoots, branches or whole plants.

There has been evident speciation along the islands of the Malay archipelago and there may be cryptic species in this genus.  Helopeltis spp. sensu stricto are important 'new encounter' pests of SE Asian cocoa  including:
 H. antonii: India through to West Irian
 H. bakeri: Malay peninsula and Philippines
 H. bradyi: Sri Lanka, Malaysia, Indonesia
 H. clavifer: Sabah and Papua New Guinea
 H. collaris: Philippines
 H. sulawesi: Sulawesi
 H. sumatranus: Sumatra
 H. theivora (with H. theobromae as a sub-species): India through to Java

Afropeltis and other cocoa Mirid pest species
Very similar to Helopeltis, the African species were placed into Afropeltis by Schmitz (1968).  These species usually have a lesser pests status than their Asian counterparts, with Sahlbergella singularis and Distantiella theobromae causing greatest cocoa tree and crop damage in Central and West Africa.  Monalonion species, belonging to the same tribe, are similarly minor pests of Latin American cocoa.

Entwistle (1972) lists and maps ten species of Afropeltis attacking cocoa:
 the A. bergrothi group:
 A. bergrothi: widely distributed east of the River Niger
 A. lalendei (= H. bergevini): very common, Ivory Coast to Nigeria
 A. serendensis: Ivory Coast and probably Ghana
 A. corbisieri: humid forest in central Africa
 A. gerini: southern Cameroun
 A. mayumbensis: north and east of the Congo River
 A. poppiusi: widespread, but only found on cocoa in Ivory Coast
 A. schoutedeni: the most widespread in tropical Africa
 A. lemosi: São Tomé and Príncipe
 A. westwoodi: widespread in west and central Africa

References

Further reading
 PestInfo wiki

External links
 
 
 DropData cocoa pest guide

Miridae genera